The Internet Professional Association (iProA) is a Hong Kong pro-Beijing trade association representing Internet-related professional services, founded in 1999. In 2011, it was accused of political interference in the awarding of a government contract for an e-learning scheme.

References

External links
 Internet Professional Association

Professional associations based in Hong Kong
Organizations established in 1999
1999 establishments in Hong Kong